The Women's Tour of New Zealand is a stage race for elite women road cyclists held in New Zealand at the end of February or the beginning of March. It is rated as 2.2 on the UCI classification scheme. It was not held in 2013 or 2014, but returned in February 2015.

Roll of honour
Source:

References

External links
 
 

Women's road bicycle races
2005 establishments in New Zealand
Cycle races in New Zealand
Recurring sporting events established in 2005